Tour de France 2013: 100 Edition is a video game developed by Cyanide, the creators of Pro Cycling Manager, and published by Focus Home Interactive.

The game is based on the 2013 Tour de France, which is the 100th edition of the race.

Like the earlier game, it's be possible to play online and like the real Tour de France, the final stage takes place during dusk.

2013 video games
Cycling video games
PlayStation 3 games
Video games developed in France
Video games set in France
Xbox 360 games